Ghulam is a 1998 Indian Hindi-language action film, directed by Vikram Bhatt, and starring Aamir Khan and Rani Mukherji in lead roles. The plot of the movie is similar to Vishesh Films' first production Kabzaa (1988), starring Sanjay Dutt, in turn inspired by Elia Kazan's On the Waterfront (1954). 

Ghulam released on 19 June 1998, and was a commercial success at the box office. 

At the 44th Filmfare Awards, Ghulam received 6 nominations, including Best Film, Best Director (Bhatt) and Best Actor (Khan), and won Best Scene of the Year. The film was remade in Tamil in 2000 as Sudhandhiram.

Plot 

Siddharth "Siddhu" Marathe is a Mumbai tapori, a boxing champion. His brother, Jai Marathe, is the  manager and right-hand man for Raunak "Ronnie" Singh, a former boxing champion who ostensibly runs a travel agency, but in reality rules the local community by terrorising people and stealing money from innocent merchants. Other than his boxing practice, Siddhu leads a relatively aimless and wanderlust life. In his spare time, he hangs out with friends, occasionally stealing money from rich people. Siddhu is financially dependent on his elder brother Jai, who lives in Raunak Singh's house, but occasionally visits Siddhu and tops up his finances.

The opening scene features a female lawyer Fatima Madam defending Siddhu in court against accusations of small-time theft. The lawyer tries to convince the judge to show leniency towards Siddhu on account of his disadvantaged background as an orphan. The judge points out that Siddhu has already been shown leniency four times, and is greeted with laughter by everybody, including Siddhu. In the commotion, Siddhu steals Rs. 400 from his own lawyer's purse. Siddhu is let free. Later, when he asks the lawyer what her fees are, she asks him for a fee of Rs. 400, and he is thus forced to part with the money he has just stolen. The lawyer gives no indication of awareness that Siddhu had stolen an equal amount of money. Later, Siddhu, while joking around with friends, gets angry when one of his friends suggests that the lawyer may be receiving sexual favours from Siddhu in exchange for defending him in court.

A few days later, Raunak Singh hires Siddhu to deliver a letter to a local cricket player, and to beat up the player if he shows signs of resisting. Unknown to Siddhu, the letter contains instructions to the player to get out after scoring a certain number of runs, so that Ronnie can win a bet. Siddhu delivers the letter and intimidates the cricket player into agreeing to follow the instructions, breaking the player's bat in the process. Later, while returning, he gets into a motorcycle speed race with a motorcycle gang led by Charlie, which escalates into a dare game to run towards a moving train at night. Siddhu beats Charlie's past record in the game. Charlie chooses to run again, but falls on the train tracks, and seems to be headed for death as the train approaches him. Siddhu rescues Charlie at considerable personal risk. In the process, Siddhu becomes friends with Alisha, also part of the gang, and their friendship blossoms into love. The famous song Aati Kya Khandala is situated during this period, when Siddhu is trying to cheer Alisha up after a fight with her father.

It is revealed that Siddhu saw his own father's death when he was a child, which mentally affected him throughout his life.

Back in his local community, Siddhu witnesses an incident of some of Ronnie's men beating up a local restaurateur for not paying extortion money to Ronnie's gang. The restaurateur runs for his life as Ronnie's men chase him, but none of the other community people come to his aid. Harihar Mafatlal, a social worker, coaxes a police constable to stop the fight. The restaurateur and his two assailants land up on the roof where Siddhu is doing boxing practice, with Hari and the constable following. The constable breaks up the fight and scolds the restaurateur, and Hari is angry at the constable for blaming the victim. The assailants left, greeting Siddhu on the way out. Siddhu offers some water to the restaurateur and introduces himself to Hari, suggesting to both to avoid getting on the wrong side of Ronnie. Hari speaks of principle and self-respect, and Siddhu is reminded of things that his father told him long ago.

Ronnie is furious to hear about this and wishes to kill the restaurateur and Hari immediately. Ronnie explains the logic of terror to his henchmen: if even a few people stop acceding to his demands, then that will instill rebelliousness against Ronnie's demands in others. Fear is essential for the kind of respect Ronnie enjoys, and being lenient against a few people who stand up to him based on a short-term cost–benefit analysis will have long-term negative consequences for Ronnie. Jai, however, dissuades Ronnie from taking rash action. In the process, it is revealed that Jai and Ronnie are in the process of bribing politicians and government officials to make Ronnie the owner of a large construction project.

Hari later canvasses some villagers together, trying to get one of them to sign a complaint against Ronnie that can be filed with the police so that official action can be taken against him. Siddhu attends the meeting at Jai's request but does not inform Jai or Ronnie about it immediately. Instead, Siddhu offers Hari a friendly warning to cease and desist these activities. During the conversation that ensues, Siddhu says that his own motto in life is simple: live and let live. Hari reveals the principle guiding his own actions: whenever he sees himself in the mirror, he should not feel ashamed of what he sees.

Ronnie nonetheless learns of the events during the meeting and is angry. He tells Siddhu to arrange a meeting between Hari and himself (Ronnie) so that Ronnie can dissuade Hari from these activities. Siddhu agrees, and calls Hari over to a bridge, on the pretext that he himself (Siddhu) needs to talk to Hari. Hari arrives at the bridge, expecting to meet Siddhu. Ronnie arrives along with his men, beats up Hari, and throws him from the bridge after which he is crushed under a moving train. Siddhu is furious at Jai and Ronnie and attacks Ronnie physically, but Ronnie's men control him, and he is allowed to go on account of the fact that he is Jai's brother and he was the one who managed to inadvertently help Ronnie kill Hari. Siddhu, returning home, cannot bear the sight of himself in the mirror, and breaks it. It is also revealed that Hari was the brother of Alisha (Siddhu's romantic interest), something Siddhu had been unaware of because he was living separately. Siddhu confesses everything to Fatima Madam, the female lawyer who had defended him at the beginning of the movie but refuses to testify against Ronnie in court, for fear of implicating his elder brother Jai. The lawyer tries to talk him into testifying but fails. She challenges him to reveal the truth to Alisha, which he does, and they break up.

In a subsequent boxing match (against boxing champion "Kala Tiger"), that Siddhu has been preparing for several months, Siddhu is told by his brother, in the midst of the game, to throw the match, since Ronnie has bet money on Siddhu losing. Siddhu throws the game, allowing the other boxer to beat him unconscious. He is furious at his brother, and they have an oral confrontation. In the process, Siddhu is forced to confront that his father had betrayed five of his friends in the Indian independence movement to the British out of fear of being tortured, causing all of them to be killed. Siddhu realises that his father was a good man, but, like everybody else, was a coward and lacked the strength to fight injustice. Yet, he knows that his father wanted to instill these values in him, and he vows to bring Hari's killers to justice and complete the task that Hari attempted to begin. He tells Fatima Madam (the lawyer) that he is willing to testify publicly against Ronnie as well as against his own brother Jai, and also confesses to her his theft of Rs. 400 (shown at the beginning of the movie). She expresses pride in Siddhu, revealing that she knew all along about the theft and also knew that Siddhu would reveal it to her someday of his own accord. She tries to get Alisha to forgive Siddhu but fails. Siddhu is now a reformed man.

When Ronnie discovers that Siddhu is the person who has filed a complaint against him, he is ready to kill Siddhu. Jai dissuades Ronnie, reassuring him that Jai himself will dissuade Siddhu from testifying publicly against Ronnie. In an emotional scene, Siddhu, when approached by Jai, confronts Jai instead, accusing Jai of neglecting his duties as an elder brother by encouraging Siddhu to follow himself in a life of crime. Jai realises his error and apologises. Upon returning home, Siddhu discovers Alisha waiting for him, and they embrace and reconcile. Later that night, Ronnie kills Jai and his men also try to kill Siddhu, but the motorcycle gang led by Charlie (whose life Siddhu had saved earlier) intervenes to save Siddhu's life. Siddhu wants to kill Ronnie in person to avenge his brother's death, but the female lawyer arrives in time to dissuade him.

The next day, in court, Siddhu gives his testimony regarding Ronnie's murder of Hari. The court is adjourned until Monday. Coming out of court, Ronnie orders for a local bandh and forces all the shops to close down. He also has Siddhu's home broken into and his belongings thrown on the street. Siddhu, upon seeing this, walks up to Ronnie's house and challenges him to come out and duel alone, rather than hiding behind henchmen. Ronnie agrees, and all the people in the area come out to watch. The two boxers have a long and bloody boxing match, with nobody interfering. Though Siddhu is severely injured, he remains victorious. As the local people see one man with the courage to fight Raunak Singh, they awaken to the possibility that they too can resist his extortionary demands. Ronnie loses the fight, but he then orders his henchmen to kill Siddhu. The local people, who are much more numerous than Ronnie's henchmen, block the attempt. Together, they beat up Ronnie and his henchmen and force them to flee the area.

Cast
Aamir Khan as Siddharth Marathe "Siddhu" 
Rani Mukerji as Alisha Mafatlal
Deepak Tijori as Charlie
Sharat Saxena as Raunak "Ronnie" Singh
Akshay Anand as Harihar "Hari" Mafatlal, Alisha's brother.
Rajit Kapoor as Jai Marathe, Siddharth's brother.
Mita Vashisht as Siddharth's lawyer Fatima madam
Dalip Tahil as Vishwanath Marathe, Siddharth's father. (special appearance)
Raju Kher as Ashok Mafatlal, Alisha's father.
Ashutosh Rana as Shyamsundar Agrawal (special appearance)
Kamlesh Oza as Avinash
Daya Shankar Pandey
Amin Hajee as Black Tiger (boxing champion)
Prithvi Zutshi
Sheikh Sami
Rahul Singh

Production 
Filming for Ghulam began in June 1997. By mid-August, a week-long schedule at a specially erected set at Film City in Mumbai was completed.

Dubbing

Rani Mukerji's voice was dubbed by Mona Shetty, who had a much more high-pitched voice. When asked if the director's decision to not use her voice in the film affected her, she said that her voice was dubbed as it "did not suit the character".

Stunts

A sequence in the film shows Aamir running on a rail track towards an oncoming train, which misses him by a few feet as he jumps off the tracks. 1.3 seconds was the only difference between Aamir and the train. This stunt was actually performed by Aamir himself. At the 44th Filmfare Awards, it won the Best Scene of the Year award, but Aamir later criticized himself for taking such an unnecessary risk.

Soundtrack

The music was composed by Jatin–Lalit. Lyrics were handled by Indeevar, Nitin Raikwar, Sameer and Vinod Mahendra. The film's soundtrack album sold 2.5million units in India, making it the year's fifth best-selling Bollywood soundtrack album.

Reception
The film was declared a hit by Box Office India and its total gross was 242 million.

Awards

Remake
The film was remade in Tamil in 2000 as Sudhandhiram.

References

External links
 

1998 films
1990s Hindi-language films
Films directed by Vikram Bhatt
Films scored by Jatin–Lalit
Indian action films
Hindi films remade in other languages
Remakes of Indian films
1998 action films
Hindi-language action films
Indian remakes of American films